A total lunar eclipse took place on Thursday, December 30, 1982. A shallow total eclipse saw the Moon in relative darkness for 1 hour 3 seconds. The Moon was 18% of its diameter into the Earth's umbral shadow, and should have been significantly darkened. The partial eclipse lasted for 3 hours and 16 minutes in total. This was a supermoon since perigee was on the same day. It was also a blue moon, the second full moon of December for the eastern hemisphere where the previous full moon was on December 1. Since total lunar eclipses are also known as blood moons, this combination (which would not recur until January 31, 2018) is known as a super blue blood moon.

Visibility

Related eclipses

Eclipses in 1982 
 A total lunar eclipse on January 9.
 A partial solar eclipse on January 25.
 A partial solar eclipse on June 21.
 A total lunar eclipse on July 6.
 A partial solar eclipse on July 20.
 A partial solar eclipse on December 15.
 A total lunar eclipse on December 30.
There are seven eclipses in 1982, the maximum possible, including 4 partial solar eclipses: January 25, July 20, June 21, and December 15.

Lunar year series

Tritos series 
 Preceded: Lunar eclipse of March 13, 1979

 Followed: Lunar eclipse of January 9, 2001

Tzolkinex 
 Preceded: Lunar eclipse of November 18, 1975

 Followed: Lunar eclipse of February 9, 1990

Half-Saros cycle
A lunar eclipse will be preceded and followed by solar eclipses by 9 years and 5.5 days (a half saros). This lunar eclipse is related to two annular solar eclipses of Solar Saros 141.

See also 
List of lunar eclipses
List of 20th-century lunar eclipses

Notes

External links 
 

1982-12
1982 in science
December 1982 events